The Gossen Prize is an annual award given by the Verein für Socialpolitik to German-speaking economists under the age of 45 whose work gained international recognition. The jury—the extended committee of the Verein für Socialpolitik—especially considers the scientist's number of publications in prestigious English-speaking journals and his mentions on the Social Sciences Citation Index. The award is named after Hermann Heinrich Gossen.

Recipients

See also

 List of economics awards
John Bates Clark Medal
Yrjö Jahnsson Award
Nakahara Prize
Assar Lindbeck Medal
Prix du meilleur jeune économiste de France

Weblinks 
  at Verein für Socialpolitik  (socialpolitik.org)

References

Economics awards
Awards with age limits